Orientation is a function of the mind involving awareness of three dimensions: time, place and person. Problems with orientation lead to disorientation, and can be due to various conditions, from delirium to intoxication. Typically, disorientation is first in time, then in place and finally in person.

Assessment

In the context of an accident or major trauma, the Emergency Medical Responder performs spiraling (increasingly detailed) assessments which guide the critical first response. Assessment of mental orientation typically lands within the immediate top three priorities: 
 Safety - Assess the area safety (potential traffic, fire, overhead/underfoot objects and collapse risks, rushing water, gunfire, chemical/radiation threats, storm conditions, downed power lines, etc.), wait for the threat to subside, or move the person to safety if and when possible, all without endangering oneself. 
 ABCs - Note conscious or unconscious then assess Airway, Breathing and Circulation factors (with priority to any potential gross or debilitating blood loss.)
 Orientation - Determine if the person is "awake, alert, and oriented, times three (to person, place, and time)." This is frequently abbreviated AAOx3 which also serves as a mnemonic. The assessment involves asking the patient to repeat his own full name, his present location, and today's date. The assessment is best done right up front, ahead of moving or transporting the victim, because it may illuminate potential internal damage.
Event/Situation - A fourth category is now used as well. If the person is oriented to what is going on around them, then they are said to be AAOx4. AAOx3 is not a concerning response since people are sometimes less aware of the situation due to pain, time of day, or lack of significant event.

Alternately, the letters in AAOx4 can be documented as COAX4. A person who is COAx4 is said to be "conscious, alert, & oriented to person, place, time and event". When a handoff report is made, anything less than 4 is specifically noted for clarity (e.g., patient is COAx2, oriented to self and place).

Mental orientation is closely related, and often intermixed with trauma shock, including physical shock (see: Shock (circulatory)) and mental shock (see: Acute stress reaction, a psychological condition in response to terrifying events.)

The exact cerebral region involved in orientation is uncertain, but lesions of the brain stem and the cerebral hemispheres have been reported to cause disorientation, suggesting that they act together in maintaining awareness and its subfunction of orientation.

Disorientation

Disorientation is the opposite of orientation.  It is a cognitive disability in which the senses of time, direction, and recognition of items (things), people and places become difficult to distinguish/identify.

Causes of mental disorientation
Disorientation can occur in healthy young adults as well as in the elderly or ill person. While exercising, if a person becomes dehydrated as a result of over-exertion, he or she may become disoriented to the time or place. While exercising, the body may not be able to supply enough oxygen to the brain fast enough.  Mental disorientation can be the aim of some performance art, as creators with 'audience disorientation' as a goal may work to deliberately augment sensations of time, place, person, purpose.

See also 
 Destabilisation
 Mental confusion
 Mental status examination
 Spatial disorientation
 Up-down cues

References

Cognition